F-class submarine may refer to:

 British F-class submarine, three submarines of the Royal Navy, built between 1913 and 1916
 Italian F-class submarine, 21 submarines of the Royal Italian Navy and three of the Royal Spanish Navy, built between 1915 and 1918
 United States F-class submarine, four submarines of the United States Navy built in 1909
 Type F submarine, five submarines of the Imperial Japanese Navy built between 1917 and 1922